Auchenblae (historically known as Auchinblae) is a village in the Kincardine and Mearns area of Aberdeenshire, formerly in Kincardineshire, Scotland. The village was known for its weavers, a whisky distillery and the annual Paldie's Fair horse market.

Etymology
The name is a derivation from the Gaelic for "Field of Flowers" possibly due to the growing of flax in bygone times.

History
The current parish church was built between 1827 and 1829 by John Smith. The church was built on the opposite side of the Luther Water was built next to an older chapel dedicated to St. Palladius and was formerly known as Fordoun Parish Church. The location of the older chapel, known as at Kirkton of Fordoun was the birthplace of the chronicler John of Fordun (before 1360 – c. 1384) and has been a religious site since the 7th century. The bones of St Palladius were brought to Auchenblae. There is a Pictish cross slab, the Fordoun Stone, in the kirk's vestibule. In the graveyard is the ancient ruin of St Palladius' Chapel and there is a memorial to Scotland's first Protestant martyr George Wishart, born at Mains of Pittarrow in the old parish of Fordoun and burnt at the stake under the orders of Cardinal Beaton in St Andrews.

James Taylor, developer of the tea industry in British Ceylon, was born in the village in 1835.

Auchenblae school house was built in 1850 and the current school building circa 1889 (they are Category C listed).

Auchenblae village hall on Monboddo Street was built to a gable roof design in 1870 to a design by the Architect Johnstone and is Category B listed.

Auchinblae distillery was a scotch whisky distillery in the village that was in operation between 1895 and 1916. Prior the distillery, the site was occupied by spinning mill, the Den Mill, that was built in 1795 beside Luther Water.

In 2009, there was a gas explosion at the Drumtochty Arms hotel in the village. The explosion left three people injured and resulted in a fine for the company, as well as demolition of the hotel.

In popular culture
It is featured in Lewis Grassic Gibbon's novel, Sunset Song, as well as being mentioned in the thrash metal song "Hotel Blast Terror" by Thrashist Regime, based on the tragic 2009 Gas explosion.

See also
Drumtochty Castle
Monboddo House

Bibliography
 A. Grove, The History of Auchenblae, Scottish Women's Rural Institutes, Auchenblae Branch, Angus, Scotland (1967)
 George Robertson (1810) A General View of Kincardineshire, Or, The Mearns, R. Phillips (Originally published by Oxford University), 576 pages
 Ronald P.A. Smith, Stonehaven/Portlethen Street Plan: Including Auchenblae, Drumlithie, Gourdon (1998)

References 

Villages in Aberdeenshire